Bolshoy Shantar is the main island of the Shantar Islands in the Sea of Okhotsk, Russia; its area is  and it measures about . It has a large brackish lake (Lake Bol'shoe, "Big Lake") on its north side which is connected to the sea through a narrow passage. Yakshin Bay indents the southwest side of the island.

Administratively this island belongs to the Khabarovsk Krai of the Russian Federation.

History
The Shantar Islands were explored by Russian surveyors between 1711 and 1725.

Bolshoy Shantar was frequented by American whaleships between 1852 and 1907. They hunted bowhead whales, particularly in the passages that separate Bolshoy Shantar from Feklistova and Prokofyeva. They also went ashore to obtain wood and water and hunt bears and foxes. Two whaleships were wrecked on the island. On 18 October 1858, the bark Rajah (250 tons), of New Bedford, was wrecked on the north side of the island during a strong gale. Captain Ansel N. Stewart, the first officer, and 11 other men perished; the second mate and the twelve other crew members were saved four days later by the ship Condor (349 tons), of New Bedford, Captain Samuel H. Whiteside. Five men, including the captain, were buried on the island. Items from the wreck were found on the island as late as 1865. On 30 August 1907, the schooner Carrie and Annie (90 tons), of San Francisco, was wrecked on the island during a gale. The crew remained stranded on Bolshoy Shantar until 11 September, when the Russian transport Nitzun rescued them.

Climate

Flora and fauna 

There are spruce forests on the island and smelts (Hypomesus japonicus) and (H. olidus) are found in Lake Bol'shoe. In the spring and summer Steller's sea eagle and Aleutian tern nest on the island; long-billed murrelet also appear to breed here.

Popular culture
This island is mentioned in the 2008 video game Grand Theft Auto IV as the location of the headquarters of a fictional peer-to-peer programme called Shitster (a spoof of Napster).

References

External links

Bear kills camper in Bolshoy Shantar Island

Shantar Islands
Islands of the Sea of Okhotsk
Islands of the Russian Far East
Islands of Khabarovsk Krai
Shipwrecks in the Sea of Okhotsk